Iloprost is a medication used to treat pulmonary arterial hypertension (PAH), scleroderma, Raynaud's phenomenon and other diseases in which the blood vessels are constricted and blood cannot flow to the tissues. This damages the tissues and causes high blood pressure. There is ongoing research into using it as a frostbite treatment. Iloprost works by opening (dilating) the blood vessels to allow the blood to flow through again. It was developed by the pharmaceutical company Schering AG and is marketed by Bayer Schering Pharma AG in Europe and Actelion Pharmaceuticals in the USA. Iloprost is given via inhalation, and a therapeautic benefit of the drug is that a very low dose is required because of the deposition in the lung. Iloprost has few systemic side effects for that reason.

Clinical pharmacology
Iloprost is a synthetic analogue of prostacyclin PGI2. Iloprost dilates systemic and pulmonary arterial vascular beds. It also affects platelet aggregation but the relevance of this effect to the treatment of pulmonary hypertension is unknown. The two diastereoisomers of iloprost differ in their potency in dilating blood vessels, with the 4S isomer substantially more potent than the 4R isomer. While Iloprost is an analog of PGI2 that activates PGI2's receptor, the prostacyclin receptor, to stimulate vasodilation, it has little selectivity in that it binds to and activates all four receptors for prostaglandin E2 viz., prostaglandin EP1 receptor, prostaglandin EP2 receptor, prostaglandin EP3 receptor, and prostaglandin EP4 receptor. Activation of the EP2 and EP4 receptors cause vasodilation but activation of the EP3 receptor causes vasoconstriction.

Dosage and administration

Inhaled
In the U.S., iloprost is inhaled specifically using the I-Neb AAD or Prodose AAD delivery systems. In Europe iloprost has been approved for use with two compressed air nebulizers with AAD delivery systems (Halolite and Prodose) as well as with two ultrasonic nebulizers Ventaneb  and I-Neb.

Ventavis is supplied in 1 mL single-use glass ampules containing either 10 μg/mL or 20 μg/mL. The 20 μg/mL concentration is intended for patients who are maintained at the 5 μg dose and who have repeatedly experienced extended treatment times which could result in incomplete dosing. Transitioning patients to the 20 μg/mL concentration using the I-neb AAD System will decrease treatment times to help maintain patient compliance.

The approved dosing regimen for iloprost is 6 to 9 times daily (no more than every 2 hours) during waking hours, according to individual need and tolerability. The significant clinical effects observed in the pivotal study of patients with PAH were achieved with a median dose of 30 μg per day (range: 12.5 to 45 μg delivered at the mouthpiece), corresponding to 6 daily inhalations of 5 μg. The majority of patients (> 80%) in the pivotal study used this median dose or a higher dose with an excellent treatment compliance after 12 weeks.

The first inhaled dose of iloprost should be 2.5 μg (as delivered at the mouthpiece). If this dose is well tolerated, dosing should be increased to 5 μg and maintained at that dose. Any patient who cannot tolerate the 5 μg dose should be maintained at 2.5 μg.

Each inhalation treatment requires one entire single-use ampule. Each single-use ampule delivers a concentration of 10 μg/mL to the medication chamber of either the I-Neb AAD or Prodose AAD System, and delivers a nominal dose of either 2.5 μg or 5.0 μg to the mouthpiece. After each inhalation session, any solution remaining in the medication chamber should be discarded. Use of the remaining solution, even if the reservoir is "topped off" with fresh medication, will result in unpredictable dosing. Patients should follow the manufacturer's instructions for cleaning the I-Neb AAD or Prodose AAD System components after each dose administration.

Complete information regarding use of iloprost in specific populations (e.g. nursing mothers, pediatrics, patients with hepatic or renal impairment), drug interactions, and overdosage can be found in full prescribing information.

Intravenous

Iloprost is also available in an intravenous form, developed and marketed by Schering AG under the trade name Ilomedine.  
IV iloprost is usually administered diluted, via a peripheral vein or central venous catheter.  The diluted iloprost should be delivered by an accurate rate delivery system such as a syringe driver.  Doses vary with individuals as side effects are better tolerated by some patients than others.  The duration of the treatment is typically 3 days.  This is usually repeated every 8 to 12 weeks.

Contraindications 
 unstable angina; within 6 months of myocardial infarction; decompensated cardiac failure (unless under close medical supervision); severe arrhythmias; congenital or acquired heart-valve defects; within 3 months of cerebrovascular events; pulmonary veno-occlusive disease; conditions which increase risk of bleeding.

Common side effects 
 In clinical studies, common adverse reactions due to inhaled iloprost included: vasodilation (flushing, 27%), cough (39%), headache (30%), flu syndrome (14%), nausea (13%), neck spasms (12%), hypotension (11%), insomnia (8%), and fainting (syncope) (8%); other serious adverse events reported with the use of Ventavis included congestive heart failure, chest pain, supraventricular tachycardia, dyspnea, swelling of the limbs (especially around the ankles and feet), and kidney failure.

Serious adverse events reported with the use of inhaled iloprost include congestive heart failure, chest pain, supraventricular tachycardia, shortness of breath, peripheral edema, and kidney failure.

Warnings 
 Iloprost as Ventavis is intended for inhalation administration only via the I-Neb AAD or Prodose AAD Systems, pulmonary drug delivery devices. It has not been studied with any other nebulizers.
 Vital signs should be monitored while initiating inhaled iloprost therapy. Dose adjustments or a change in therapy should be considered if exertional syncope occurs. Inhaled iloprost should not be initiated in patients with systolic blood pressure lower than 85 mm Hg. Iloprost should be stopped immediately if signs of pulmonary edema occur. This may be a sign of pulmonary venous hypertension. Iloprost has not been evaluated in patients with chronic obstructive pulmonary disease (COPD), severe asthma, or with acute pulmonary infections.
 Should signs of pulmonary edema occur when inhaled iloprost is administered in patients with pulmonary hypertension, the treatment should be stopped immediately. This may be a sign of pulmonary venous hypertension.

See also
 Pulmonary arterial hypertension (PAH)
 Raynaud's phenomenon
 Scleroderma

References

 Ventavis Package insert prescribing information available in PDF format.
 
 ATS 2005. The International Conference of the American Thoracic Society. 20–25 May 2005. San Diego, CA.

External links 
 

Orphan drugs
Prostaglandins
Alkyne derivatives
Bayer brands
Johnson & Johnson brands
Alkene derivatives
Secondary alcohols
Carboxylic acids